May refer to Mount Victory, Ohio, a village in Hardin County, Ohio, United States. 
 May refer to Mount Victory, Papua New Guinea, a volcano on the north east coast of Oro Province, Papua New Guinea.